Siyabonga Melongisi Shibe (born February 23, 1978) is a South African actor from Umlazi, KwaZulu-Natal.

Early life 
Shibe was born and raised in Umlazi, Kwazulu-Natal. He attended Ganges Secondary School, where his teachers encouraged him to pursue acting. As a child, Shibe would regularly participate in community plays in Umlazi. After finishing high school, he went to study drama at Technikon Natal. Shibe, along other fellow students at Technikon Natal, formed a theatre group called Amagugu. After completing his studies he went to Johannesburg to further pursue his dream of being an actor.

Career 
Upon his arrival in Johannesburg, he faced various obstacles but his luck changed when he bagged an advert for HIV/AIDS awareness. He went on to land a role in a feature film called The Stripes of a Hero.

In 2002 to 2005, he bagged a leading role as Sifiso in the SABC1 drama series Gaz'lam. The series went on to receive multiple nominations from the South African Film and Television Awards. After he finished filming the first season of Gaz'lam, Shibe was cast  as James in the feature film James' Journey to Jerusalem, written and directed by Ra'anan Alexandrowicz. The film revolves around an African teenager named James who goes on a pilgrimage to the Holy Land on behalf of his village.
Shibe ended up winning the Best Male Actor award at the Jerusalem International Film Festival. He also landed a role in the Canadian mini-series Human Cargo. The series won seven Gemini Awards and two Directors Guild Awards. He also starred in the British series Wild At Heart and Mtunzini.com; however, Shibe resigned from the latter due to financial disputes.

In 2006, he played the role of Mad Dog in the feature film The Trail. In 2007, he played the role of Mandla Nyawose in the drama series Bay of Plenty. In 2008, he was cast to portray the role of Thami in the drama series A Place Called Home. From 2010 to 2014, Shibe portrayed the character of Kila, a smart, shrewd and violent taxi driver in the e.tv soap opera Scandal!. He was awarded the Best Actor award at the Duku Duku Awards for his role as Kila.

In 2015, Shibe landed a role in the e.tv telenovela Ashes to Ashes; his portrayal of the character Kgosi earned him a SAFTA nomination for Best Actor.

In 2017, he left Johannesburg for Durban to join the most viewed South African television show, Uzalo, where he portrays the role of Qhabanga Mhlongo.

Television roles 
 Ashes to Ashes (Kgosi)
 Z'bondiwe (Bheka Shabangu)
 A Place Called Home (as Thami)
 Bay of Plenty (as Mandla Nyawose)
 Doubt (as Captain Dube)
 Gaz'lam (as Sifiso)
 Generations (as Joshua)
 Home Affairs (as Zakes)
 Isidingo (as Detective Nelson Xaba)
 Is'thunzi (as Matthews)
 Madiba (as Chief Jongintaba)
 Mtunzini.com (as Waxy)
 Scandal! (as Kila)
 Silent Witness (as Maidstone)
 Stokvel (as Richard)
 Wild at Heart (Themba Khumalo)
 Uzalo (Qhabanga Khumalo)
 The Wife (Gwaza Majola)

Personal life 
Shibe has a 6-year-old son.

Awards and nominations

See also 
 Uzalo
 Ashes to Ashes
 Scandal!
 James' Journey to Jerusalem

References

External links

1978 births
Living people
People from Durban
Zulu people
South African male television actors